Nautical units of measurement in current or historical use include:

See also
Ship measurements
Glossary of nautical terms

References

nautical units
nautical units